Sky Diving (also known as Go! Sports Skydiving) is a downloadable video game on the PlayStation Store developed by Bergsala Lightweight. It was released in North America on February 7, 2008.

Gameplay
Sky Diving relies on the DualShock 3's Sixaxis motion controls. The player free falls by tilting the controller, with additional stunts also using motion sensing. There are two main modes; Formation and Landing. Formation has the player and a team of three other skydivers (either other players online or computer controlled) perform different stunt setups. In Landing, the player must make a perfect landing on a designated target. A third mode, Extreme, is unlocked when the player earns the S license for the Landing mode. There, the player is tasked with collecting money while free falling. The game features a global ranking system for the Formation and Landing modes. Replays can be downloaded through the leaderboards for players to watch.

Reception

Sky Diving received negative reviews from critics. On Metacritic, the game holds a score of 42/100 based on 10 reviews. Lack of content and the motion controls being over-sensitive were common points of criticism for the game.

References

External links
Sky Diving on the PlayStation Store (Wayback Machine copy)

2008 video games
Lightweight (company) games
Multiplayer and single-player video games
Parachuting video games
PlayStation 3 games
PlayStation 3-only games
PlayStation Network games
Sony Interactive Entertainment games
Video games developed in Japan